Felix Driver FBA FAcSS (born 23 August 1961) is a distinguished British historical geographer and Professor of Human Geography at Royal Holloway, University of London.

Driver is a historical geographer with a particular interest in the history of cultural collections. He has also examined the culture of exploring, empire and imperial cities. He has overseen collaborative research projects, in partnership with leading cultural institutions such as the British Museum and the V&A.

In 2000, he was the winner of the prestigious Royal Geographical Society Murchison Award. He was appointed a Fellow of the Academy of Social Sciences in 2007 and a Fellow of the British Academy in 2011.

References

1961 births
Living people
Academics of Royal Holloway, University of London
Alumni of the University of Cambridge
Fellows of the British Academy
Fellows of the Academy of Social Sciences
British geographers
English geographers
Human geographers
Historical geographers
21st-century geographers
20th-century geographers
21st-century English educators
20th-century English educators